Shay Duffin (26 February 1931 – 23 April 2010) was an Irish character actor of the stage and screen. He was in the 1993 film Leprechaun with Jennifer Aniston. He also had a role in the 1997 film Titanic.

He  was best known for writing and acting the title role in the one-man play Brendan Behan: Confessions of An Irish Rebel.

Discography
1972: Shay Duffin Is Brendan Behan (Potato Records / POT 3202)

Filmography

References

External links
 

1931 births
2010 deaths
Irish expatriate male actors in the United States
Male actors from Dublin (city)
20th-century Irish dramatists and playwrights
Irish male film actors